The North Jersey Interscholastic Conference, or NJIC, is a high school athletic conference located in New Jersey.  It is one of the so-called "super conferences" created by the New Jersey State Interscholastic Athletic Association (NJSIAA) as a part of a realignment of high school sports leagues in North and Central New Jersey announced in 2009. The conference is composed of small-enrollment schools.

A total of 36 public and private high schools are part of the NJIC.  Most of the schools are located in Bergen County (27), with the rest in Passaic County (6) and Hudson County (3). Butler High School, in Morris County, was added starting in the 2018–19 school year.

Formation

Increasing conflict over competitive imbalance in New Jersey high school sports leagues led to the formation of a committee to study the issue in 2008.  The group proposed to disband the 11 athletic conferences in the northern part of the state and create six larger "super conferences".

After a lengthy series of meetings and revisions, final implementation of the plan took place with the start of the 2010–11 school year. In the northeast corner of New Jersey, two super conferences emerged:  the Big North Conference for larger schools and the NJIC for smaller schools.

All NJIC schools were previously associated with four previous conferences: The Bergen County Scholastic League National / Olympic, the Bergen County Scholastic League / American, the Bergen-Passaic Scholastic League, and the North Bergen Interscholastic Athletic League. All of the BCSL  National/Olympic and B-PSL members joined the NJIC. Rutherford HS was the only BCSL American Division School to enter the NJIC. Pascack Hills was the only NBIAL school to enter the NJIC.Paterson Catholic High School(a member of the B-PSL) closed in the spring of 2010 and therefore never joined the NJIC.

Pascack Hills High School was a member of the BCSL National/Olympic for football only; it was part of the North Bergen Interscholastic Athletic League for all other sports and was the only NBIAL school to join the NJIC. The school petitioned the NJIC to join the Big North for the 2011-12school year, was granted permission by the NJIC, and this conference switch was then approved by the Big North and the NJSIAA.

Three other schools—Hawthorne Christian, Mary Help of Christians and Saddle River Day—had been independent prior to the start of the realignment process. Hawthorne Christian and Saddle River Day were placed in the BCSL National/Olympic and Mary Help of Christians Academy was placed in the B-PSL as a transitional step before the NJIC began play.

The North Jersey Interscholastic Conference is a registered New Jersey Non-Profit Corporation.

Member schools

Bergen County public schools

Bergen County non-public schools

Hudson County Public Schools

Morris County public schools

Passaic County public schools

Passaic County Non-Public Schools

Sports offered

Fall sports

 Cross Country
 Football 
 Soccer
 Tennis (Girls)
 Volleyball (Girls)

Winter sports 

 Basketball
 Bowling
 Swimming
 Track & Field
 Wrestling

Spring sports 

 Baseball
 Golf
 Softball
 Tennis (Boys)
 Track & Field

Conference Divisions
The NJIC is divided into four divisions, largely along geographic and enrollment lines. Divisional alignments are reviewed every 2-year scheduling cycle by the conference. Because not all conference members participate in bowling, cross-country, football, golf, tennis and wrestling, different divisional alignments exist for those sports. Football and wrestling are sports specific and do not fall into the traditional divisional alignments.

Colonial Division
Elmwood Park
Garfield
Glen Rock
Lodi
Rutherford
Eastern Christian
Hawthorne
Manchester
Pompton Lakes
Mary Help of Christians

Meadowlands Division
Becton
Hasbrouck Heights
Immaculate Conception
North Arlington
Saddle Brook
St. Mary
Wallington
Weehawken
Wood-Ridge

Liberty Division 
Dwight Englewood
Harrison
Leonia
Lyndhurst
New Milford
Ridgefield
Secaucus
Queen of Peace

Patriot Division
Bogota
Cresskill
Emerson
Hawthorne Christian
Midland Park
Palisades Park
Park Ridge
Saddle River Day
Waldwick

References

External links 
 Conference website NJICathletics.org

New Jersey high school athletic conferences